The Knight's Cross of the Iron Cross and its variants were the highest award in the military and paramilitary forces of Nazi Germany. During World War II, 457 servicemen of the Waffen-SS, including volunteers and conscripts from Belgium, Croatia, Denmark, Estonia, France, Hungary, Latvia, Netherlands and Norway, received the Knight's Cross of the Iron Cross. Of these, 411 presentations were formally made and evidence of the award is available in the German Federal Archives. One recipient, Hermann Fegelein, was court-martialed and executed on 29 April 1945. According to German law he was deprived of rank and all awards previously. Fegelein must therefore be considered a de facto but not de jure recipient. A further 46 Knight's Cross, 8 Knight's Cross with Oak Leaves and 4 Knight's Cross with Oak Leaves and Swords recipients are either lacking the evidence to sustain their listings or received the award under questionable legal terms. All of them were accepted by the Association of Knight's Cross Recipients as legitimate recipients.

The Oberkommando der Wehrmacht kept separate Knight's Cross lists, one for each of the three military branches, Heer (Army), Kriegsmarine (Navy), Luftwaffe (Air force) and for the Waffen-SS. Within each of these lists, a unique sequential number was assigned to each recipient. The same numbering paradigm was applied to the higher grades of the Knight's Cross, one list per grade.

Background
The Knight's Cross of the Iron Cross and its higher grades were based on four separate enactments. The first enactment,  of 1 September 1939 instituted the Iron Cross, the Knight's Cross of the Iron Cross and the Grand Cross of the Iron Cross. Article 2 of the enactment mandated that the award of a higher class be preceded by the award of all preceding classes. As the war progressed, some of the recipients of the Knight's Cross distinguished themselves further and a higher grade, the Oak Leaves to the Knight's Cross of the Iron Cross, was instituted. The Oak Leaves, as they were commonly referred to, were based on the enactment  of 3 June 1940. In 1941, two higher grades of the Knight's Cross were instituted. The enactment  of 28 September 1941 introduced the Knight's Cross of the Iron Cross with Oak Leaves and Swords and the Knight's Cross of the Iron Cross with Oak Leaves, Swords and Diamonds. At the end of 1944 the final grade, the Knight's Cross of the Iron Cross with Golden Oak Leaves, Swords, and Diamonds, based on the enactment  of 29 December 1944, became the final variant of the Knight's Cross authorized.

Recipients
The list is initially sorted alphabetically.

Notes

References

Citations

Bibliography

External links
 

Waffen SS